Edwin F. Davis (May 28, 1846 – May 26, 1923), of Corning, Steuben County, New York, was the first "state electrician" (executioner) for the state of New York. In 1890, Davis finalized many features of the first electric chair used. Davis performed 240 executions between 1890 and 1914, including the first person to be executed by electric chair, William Kemmler, and the first woman, Martha M. Place, as well as William McKinley's assassin, Leon Frank Czolgosz.

Davis held a patent on certain features of the electric chair. He received U.S. Patent No. 587,649 for his "Electrocution-Chair" on August 3, 1897.

He died in May 1923 and is buried in Barnard Cemetery in Corning, New York.

See also
List of executioners

References

1846 births
1923 deaths
American executioners
People from Corning, New York
19th-century American inventors
American electricians
Burials in New York (state)